Swazi music may refer to:

Music of Eswatini
Ethnic Swazi music